Conops flavipes is a species of fly from the genus Conops in the family Conopidae. Their larvae are endoparasites of bumble bees of the genus Bombus. It is common throughout much of Europe.

References 

Parasitic flies
Conopidae
Flies described in 1758
Muscomorph flies of Europe
Articles containing video clips
Taxa named by Carl Linnaeus
Endoparasites
Parasites of bees